Walter Hollmann (27 December 1915 – 5 September 1967) was a Czech alpine skier. He competed in the men's combined event at the 1936 Winter Olympics.

References

1915 births
1967 deaths
Czech male alpine skiers
Olympic alpine skiers of Czechoslovakia
Alpine skiers at the 1936 Winter Olympics
Place of birth missing